Akwaeke Emezi is a Nigerian fiction writer and video artist, best known for their novels Freshwater,  Pet, and their New York Times bestselling novel The Death of Vivek Oji. Emezi is a generalist who writes speculative fiction, romance, memoir and poetry for both young adults and adults with mostly LGBT themes. Their work has earned them several awards and nominations including the Otherwise Award and  Commonwealth Short Story Prize. In 2021, Time featured them as a Next Generation Leader.

Early life and education 
Akwaeke Emezi was born in Umuahia in 1987 to an Igbo Nigerian father, and a mother who was the daughter of Sri Lankan immigrants living in Malaysia. Emezi grew up in Aba. Emezi started reading fantasy books and with their sister Yagazie used storytelling to escape the riots, dictatorship, and dangerous reality of their childhoods. Emezi was a "voracious" reader during childhood and they began writing short stories when they were five years old.

Emezi relocated to Appalachia, United States when they were 16 years old to attend college. After college, they enrolled in a veterinary school and dropped out before receiving their MPA in international public policy and nonprofit management from New York University. Emezi briefly started a short lived anonymous sex blog and a natural-hair blog which gave them little recognition. In 2014, they entered the MFA creative fiction writing program at Syracuse where they started the draft of their debut novel Freshwater after which they attended a Nigerian writing workshop in Lagos.

Career

Emezi's debut novel Freshwater tells the semi-autobiographical story of the protagonist, Ada, who is an ogbanje (an Igbo evil spirit). Emezi explores their Igbo heritage's spirituality and gender alongside those of Western construction and invites their audience to think critically about this spirit/body binary.

Freshwater received significant critical acclaim and was longlisted for numerous prestigious awards. Emezi was also recognized as a 2018 National Book Foundation "5 Under 35" honoree.

In 2019, Freshwater was nominated for the Women's Prize for Fiction—the first time a non-binary transgender author has been nominated for the prize. Women's prize judge Professor Kate Williams said that the panel did not know Emezi was non-binary when the book was chosen, but she said Emezi was happy to be nominated. Non-binary commentator Vic Parsons wrote that the nomination raised uncomfortable questions, asking: "would a non-binary author who was assigned male at birth have been longlisted? I highly doubt it." After the nomination, it was announced that the Women's Prize Trust was working on new guidelines for transgender, non-binary, and genderfluid authors. The Women's Prize later asked for Emezi's "sex as defined by law" when submitting The Death of Vivek Oji for inclusion, and Emezi chose to withdraw, calling the requirement transphobic and specifically exclusionary to trans women.

Emezi's second novel and first young adult novel Pet, released on 10 September 2019, is about a transgender teenager named Jam living in a world where adults refuse to acknowledge the existence of monsters. A prequel Bitter, was released in February 2022.

Emezi signed a two-book deal with Riverhead Books. The first, The Death of Vivek Oji, came out on 4 August 2020 and was a New York Times best seller. The second is a memoir entitled Dear Senthuran: A Black Spirit Memoir.

Emezi's debut poetry collection Content Warning: Everything was published in April 2022.

In April 2021, Deadline Hollywood announced that Amazon Studios won the right to adapt their debut romance novel You Made a Fool of Death with Your Beauty into a feature film. It was purchased in a high six figure deal which Deadline called the biggest book deal of the year so far. Michael B. Jordan’s Outlier Society will develop it alongside Elizabeth Raposo. Emezi will serve as the executive producer.

Other works 
Emezi will write and executive produce the TV series adaptation of their novel Freshwater for FX alongside Tamara P. Carter. It will be produced by FX Productions with Kevin Wandell and Lindsey Donahue.

Personal life 
Emezi identifies as non-binary transgender. They use the pronouns they/them/theirs. They experience multiplicity and consider themself an ogbanje. They experienced their first personality split when they were 16, a week after moving to the United States. They have written about their experience of undergoing gender confirmation surgery.

Awards and nominations

Bibliography

Novels

Young adult novels

Nonfiction

Poetry

References

External links
 
 

Living people
Non-binary novelists
Nigerian fantasy writers
21st-century Nigerian novelists
21st-century Nigerian artists
Non-binary artists
Nigerian LGBT novelists
Igbo novelists
1987 births
People from Umuahia
Nommo Award winners
21st-century Nigerian LGBT people
Nigerian memoirists
Nigerian non-binary people